Homer Mensch (November 14, 1914 in Sussex, New Jersey – December 9, 2005 in Manhattan, New York) was a prominent classical bassist who was a former member of the Pittsburgh Symphony, the New York Philharmonic, the New York Pops, and the NBC Symphony. Mensch held faculty positions at Yale University, at the Manhattan School of Music (in both the college and pre-college divisions), the Juilliard School (also in both divisions), the Mannes College of Music, Rutgers University, Dalcroze School, Queens College, and Catholic University. He taught upwards of 45 students a week from beginners, to conservatory students, to professionals both in the classical and jazz fields.

Career as a double bassist
Mensch studied bass with former New York Philharmonic principal bassist Anselme Fortier at the Manhattan School of Music. As a teenager, he played with the Dick Messner Big Band at the Hotel McAlpin in order to pay for his bass lessons. He was an excellent tennis player in his youth, and originally wanted to pursue a career in tennis. However, he was also a promising bassist and eventually chose music over tennis. "This was at the start of the Great Depression", he told the Juilliard Journal, "so pursuing a career in music was pretty risky. I was lucky that my parents didn't try to make me go into a field that was a safer bet."

Mensch joined the Pittsburgh Symphony in 1932 after winning the audition on the stage of Carnegie Hall in front of Otto Klemperer. He was assistant principal bass under Klemperer and Fritz Reiner until 1938. He then joined the New York Philharmonic under John Barbirolli. In 1943, Mensch left the Philharmonic to serve in the U.S. Army in Texas, during which time he played bass in the U.S. Army Band.

In 1944, Mensch returned to New York as a freelance musician. He subsequently performed with the NBC Symphony under Arturo Toscanini and played in numerous television and radio shows. He recorded with Gregor Piatagorsky, Isaac Stern, Nathan Milstein, the Bach Aria Group, the Casals Festival Orchestra, the Columbia Symphony, and on every commercial recording made in NY. He also recorded with Frank Sinatra, Barbra Streisand, Paul McCartney, and numerous others. Mensch can also be heard on many soundtracks from the 1940s until the 1970s.

At the request of the New York Philharmonic's then-conductor, Leonard Bernstein, Mensch returned to the Philharmonic in 1966. He remained until 1975, playing under Bernstein and Pierre Boulez. After leaving the Philharmonic, he served as principal bass of the Mostly Mozart Festival Orchestra, the New York Chamber Symphony, the New York Choral Society, Little Orchestra Society, and the New York Pops.

Teaching career
Mensch joined the Juilliard faculty in 1970 and became the chair of the double bass department in 2002. He joined the Manhattan School of Music faculty in 1980 and received MSM's Presidential Medal for Distinguished Service in May 2005.

Collaborations 
With Michael Franks
 Passionfruit (Warner Bros. Records, 1983)

With Jon Lucien
 Romantico (Zemajo, 1980)

With Nina Simone
 Baltimore (CTI, 1978)

Notable students
 Nathaniel Ayers, homeless cellist, subject of the book and movie, The Soloist, was Mensch's double bass student while at Juilliard; Mensch was his mentor
 Mark Helias, composer
 Steve Kirby, jazz bassist
 Albert Laszlo, Juilliard School and University of Cincinnati – College-Conservatory of Music professor of double bass
 Christian McBride, jazz master
 Linda McKnight, Manhattan School of Music professor of double bass
 Michael Benjamin Nigrin, member of the Buffalo Philharmonic
 Donald Palma, Yale University professor of double bass
 Frank Tusa, jazz bassist
 Jean-Yves Benichou, Toulouse Chamber Orchestra, Strasbourg Philharmonic, Electric Jazz Bassist
 Kurt Muroki, Chamber Music Society of Lincoln Ctr, Indiana University Professor

See also
 List of contemporary classical double bass players
 Juilliard School
 Manhattan School of Music

References

External links

 Juilliard Journal 2005 obituary
 New York Times obituary
 PlayBill article on Mensch
 New York Times. "New York Day by Day: Stringed Subway Rider" (March 17, 1984)
 Official website
 Time: Still on the Beat (March 15, 2004)
 Juilliard Journal: Remembering a True Mensch
 Juilliard Journal: Interview with Homer Mensch

Classical double-bassists
1914 births
2005 deaths
People from Sussex, New Jersey
Juilliard School faculty
Manhattan School of Music faculty
Musicians from Pittsburgh
Yale University faculty
Rutgers University faculty
Benjamin T. Rome School of Music, Drama, and Art faculty
20th-century American musicians
20th-century classical musicians
20th-century double-bassists